Onslow County is a county located in the U.S. state of North Carolina. As of the 2020 census, the population was 204,576. Its county seat is Jacksonville. The county was created in 1734 as Onslow Precinct and gained county status in 1739. Onslow County comprises the Jacksonville, NC Metropolitan Statistical Area. The southern border is the coast of the Atlantic Ocean.

History
European, mainly English, settlers arrived here in 1713 in what was originally part of the colonial precincts of Carteret and New Hanover. Onslow County was formed in 1734 and was named for Arthur Onslow, the longest serving speaker of the House of Commons. After a lethal 1752 hurricane, the county courthouse was relocated from Town Point to Wantland's Ferry; this settlement was eventually incorporated in 1842 and named Jacksonville after President Andrew Jackson. Through much of the first half of the 20th century, the county was largely rural, with an economy based on agrarian and maritime communities.

During World War II, Onslow County was dramatically changed in the early 1940s with the establishment of the United States Army Camp Davis near Holly Ridge (now defunct), and the creation of Camp Lejeune in 1941. This increased county population and generated related growth in housing and businesses.

The city of Jacksonville is the county seat, and the areas surrounding the city constitute the major population centers and growth areas in the county. The county is home to more than 150,000 people and includes the incorporated towns of Holly Ridge, Richlands, Swansboro, North Topsail Beach, part of Surf City and unincorporated Sneads Ferry.

Geography

It is bordered by Jones County, Carteret County, Pender County, and Duplin County.

Wildlife 
The New River and its vicinity is sometimes inhabited by bald eagles, dolphins, and cownose rays.

State and local protected areas 
 Bear Island Area Outstanding Resource Water
 Hammocks Beach State Park
 Hofmann Forest (part)
 Holly Shelter Game Land (part)
 North Carolina National Estuarine Research Reserve
 Onslow Beach
 Primary Nursery Areas
 Sandy Run Savannas State Natural Area (part)
 Sea Turtle Sanctuary
 Stump Sound Area Outstanding Resource Water
 White Oak River Mechanical Harvesting of Oysters Prohibited Area (part)
 White Oak River Impoundment Game Land (part)

Major water bodies 
 Atlantic Ocean
 Intracoastal Waterway
 New River
 Onslow Bay
 Queen Creek
 White Oak River

Major highways

Major infrastructure 
 Albert J. Ellis Airport, located in Richlands and is served by two commercial airlines.
 Amtrak Thruway (Jacksonville)
 Marine Corps Base Camp Lejeune, military base south of Jacksonville (Sneads Ferry)
 MCAS New River, military base in Jacksonville

Demographics

2020 census

As of the 2020 United States census, there were 204,576 people, 63,604 households, and 46,202 families residing in the county.

2000 census
As of the census of 2000, 150,355 people, 48,122 households, and 36,572 families resided in the county.  The population density was 196 people per square mile (76/km2).  The 55,726 housing units averaged 73 per square mile (28/km2).  The racial makeup of the county was 72.06% White, 18.48% African American, 0.74% Native American, 1.68% Asian, 0.19% Pacific Islander, 3.62% from other races, and 3.22% from two or more races.  About 7.25% of the population were Hispanic or Latino of any race.

Of the 48,122 households, 42.60% had children under the age of 18 living with them, 61.00% were married couples living together, 11.60% had a female householder with no husband present, and 24.00% were not families. About 18.60% of all households were made up of individuals, and 5.20% had someone living alone who was 65 years of age or older.  The average household size was 2.72 and the average family size was 3.09.

In the county, the population was distributed as 26.20% under the age of 18, 23.80% from 18 to 24, 29.20% from 25 to 44, 14.40% from 45 to 64, and 6.30% who were 65 years of age or older.  The median age was 25 years. For every 100 females, there were 123.20 males.  For every 100 females age 18 and over, there were 131.30 males.

The median income for a household in the county was $33,756, and for a family was $36,692. Males had a median income of $22,061 versus $20,094 for females. The per capita income for the county was $14,853.  About 10.80% of families and 12.90% of the population were below the poverty line, including 16.70% of those under age 18 and 14.70% of those age 65 or over.

Government and politics
Onslow is a typical "Solid South" county in its voting patterns. Except for the 1928 election, when anti-Catholic sentiment allowed Herbert Hoover to carry the county over Al Smith, it was solidly Democratic until 1968, during the FDR years by margins of as much as 13 to one in 1936. However, the 1960s onwards had Onslow turn to George Wallace in 1968 and then overwhelmingly to Richard Nixon over George McGovern in 1972. Since then, Onslow has become a strongly Republican county; the last Democrat to carry it was Jimmy Carter in 1976, and Carter in 1980 remains the last of his party to top 40%.

Onslow County is a member of the regional Eastern Carolina Council of Governments.

The structure of local government in Onslow County was changed in 2016 to have seven commissioners in 2018 board of commissioners, all elected at-large for four-year terms. In contrast to electing members from districts, this structure means that candidates are elected by the majority population in the county, which gives a more accurate view of the entire electorate. On November 8, 2016, citizens voted in favor to alter the number of commissioners from five commissioners with concurrent terms to seven with staggered terms. In 2018, citizens elected two more county commissioners in the general election on November 6, 2018, to four-year terms. The citizens of the county will elect five commissioners in 2020, but the four candidates who receive the highest number of votes in the general election of 2020 will receive a four-year term and the candidate who receives the fifth-highest number of votes in the general election of 2020 to a two-year term. Thereafter, all county commissioners would be elected to serve four-year terms.  The board establishes policies and ordinances implemented by the county manager and his staff. Commissioners are Jack Bright (chair), Royce Bennett (vice chair), Paul Buchanan, Robin Knapp, Mark Price, Tim Foster, and William Shanahan.

In the North Carolina Senate, Onslow County is located in the 6th Senate District, which is represented by Republican Harry Brown. In the North Carolina House of Representatives, Onslow County is split into three House districts with the 14th and 15th House Districts completely in Onslow County and the 16th House District in part of Onslow County and all of neighboring Pender County. The 16th District is represented by Republican Jimmy Dixon, the 14th District is represented by Republican George Cleveland, and the 15th District is represented by Republican Phil Shepard.

The main law enforcement agency for Onslow County is the County Sheriff's Department. The elected sheriff is Hans Miller.

Education
Onslow County Schools serves the county, except for Camp Lejeune and Marine Corps Air Station New River, which are served by Department of Defense Education Activity (DoDEA) schools.

Communities

Incorporated comunities
 Jacksonville (county seat and largest city)
 Holly Ridge
 North Topsail Beach
 Richlands
 Surf City
 Swansboro
 Verona

Unincorporated community
 Hubert

Census-designated places
 Half Moon
 Piney Green
 Pumpkin Center
 Sneads Ferry

Townships 
 Camp Lejeune
 Hofmann Forest
 Jacksonville
 Richlands
 Stump Sound
 Swansboro
 White Oak

See also
 List of counties in North Carolina
 National Register of Historic Places listings in Onslow County, North Carolina
 North Carolina State Parks

References

External links

 
 
 Onslow County Museum
 Onslow County Schools
 NCGenWeb Onslow County - free genealogy resources for the county

 
1739 establishments in North Carolina
Populated places established in 1739